Yevgeni Ruslanovich Bolotov (born 4 June 2001) is a Russian football player. He plays for FC Orenburg.

Club career
He made his debut for the main squad of FC Orenburg on 25 September 2018 in a Russian Cup game against FC Dynamo Barnaul. He made his Russian Football National League debut for Orenburg on 12 August 2020 in a game against Alania Vladikavkaz.

References

External links
 

2001 births
Living people
Russian footballers
FC Orenburg players
FC Tyumen players
Association football midfielders
Russian First League players
Russian Second League players